Akalapuzha (Malayalam: അകലാപ്പുഴ) is a lake situated in the Kozhikode, Kerala. Flowing as a distributory of Korapuzha from Kanayankodu in Koyilandy, Akalapuzha flows northwest to meet the Kuttiyadipuzha at Payyoli Chirp (Payyoli Canal).

Etymology 
As per the Malabar Manual by William Logan, the name Akalapuzha was derived from 'Akalamulla Puzha' (അകലമുള്ള പുഴ), meaning 'river with distance'. Thurayur near Akalapuzha was a port town during the British reign in India and the water transport was very active in the lake until the end of twentieth century. It is known as the Kuttanad of Kozhikode.

Geography 
The Payyoli Canal connects Akalapuzha lake with its tributary Kuttiyadi Puzha. It is situated between the Koyilandy and Payyoli municipalities and Thikkodi and Keezhariyur villages. It flows towards Korapuzha river as Muthambi River.{
  "type": "FeatureCollection",
  "features": [
    {
      "type": "Feature",
      "properties": {},
      "geometry": {
        "type": "Polygon",
        "coordinates": [
          [
            [
              75.645633,
              11.51644
            ],
            [
              75.649624,
              11.513202
            ],
            [
              75.65237,
              11.513496
            ],
            [
              75.653701,
              11.513454
            ],
            [
              75.653701,
              11.514842
            ],
            [
              75.65589,
              11.517198
            ],
            [
              75.659194,
              11.516987
            ],
            [
              75.660481,
              11.515768
            ],
            [
              75.660095,
              11.513454
            ],
            [
              75.661211,
              11.511982
            ],
            [
              75.66473,
              11.510594
            ],
            [
              75.665588,
              11.51215
            ],
            [
              75.66679,
              11.511688
            ],
            [
              75.669665,
              11.508659
            ],
            [
              75.669708,
              11.506136
            ],
            [
              75.671639,
              11.504916
            ],
            [
              75.671639,
              11.504916
            ],
            [
              75.672326,
              11.502182
            ],
            [
              75.674214,
              11.497513
            ],
            [
              75.678763,
              11.49541
            ],
            [
              75.678849,
              11.493433
            ],
            [
              75.68018,
              11.491078
            ],
            [
              75.682111,
              11.489395
            ],
            [
              75.68254,
              11.489858
            ],
            [
              75.687904,
              11.486619
            ],
            [
              75.689664,
              11.483717
            ],
            [
              75.693269,
              11.481024
            ],
            [
              75.694041,
              11.477575
            ],
            [
              75.693955,
              11.477575
            ],
            [
              75.693698,
              11.476608
            ],
            [
              75.69284,
              11.476734
            ],
            [
              75.691209,
              11.477828
            ],
            [
              75.691552,
              11.479132
            ],
            [
              75.692496,
              11.480604
            ],
            [
              75.691381,
              11.481235
            ],
            [
              75.691338,
              11.480267
            ],
            [
              75.690737,
              11.479889
            ],
            [
              75.689149,
              11.481445
            ],
            [
              75.689149,
              11.48237
            ],
            [
              75.685973,
              11.482623
            ],
            [
              75.685201,
              11.484221
            ],
            [
              75.683742,
              11.484516
            ],
            [
              75.68357,
              11.483296
            ],
            [
              75.682712,
              11.483086
            ],
            [
              75.679579,
              11.48439
            ],
            [
              75.679579,
              11.48439
            ],
            [
              75.67872,
              11.48704
            ],
            [
              75.677133,
              11.489732
            ],
            [
              75.674644,
              11.491078
            ],
            [
              75.672069,
              11.494274
            ],
            [
              75.672069,
              11.494274
            ],
            [
              75.670352,
              11.495578
            ],
            [
              75.667777,
              11.502897
            ],
            [
              75.666018,
              11.506052
            ],
            [
              75.666018,
              11.506052
            ],
            [
              75.6637,
              11.507902
            ],
            [
              75.662284,
              11.508155
            ],
            [
              75.661125,
              11.506598
            ],
            [
              75.660567,
              11.505968
            ],
            [
              75.65928,
              11.505883
            ],
            [
              75.658293,
              11.507356
            ],
            [
              75.65619,
              11.509963
            ],
            [
              75.655031,
              11.510931
            ],
            [
              75.655031,
              11.510931
            ],
            [
              75.653057,
              11.510889
            ],
            [
              75.649967,
              11.509627
            ],
            [
              75.649667,
              11.508491
            ],
            [
              75.651813,
              11.50479
            ],
            [
              75.652757,
              11.502308
            ],
            [
              75.651984,
              11.501173
            ],
            [
              75.649152,
              11.501804
            ],
            [
              75.64559,
              11.507986
            ],
            [
              75.643358,
              11.50887
            ],
            [
              75.642285,
              11.512992
            ],
            [
              75.642285,
              11.512992
            ],
            [
              75.644002,
              11.514506
            ],
            [
              75.643144,
              11.514842
            ],
            [
              75.642929,
              11.51623
            ],
            [
              75.643272,
              11.51724
            ],
            [
              75.644088,
              11.517324
            ],
            [
              75.644689,
              11.516609
            ],
            [
              75.645633,
              11.51644
            ]
          ]
        ]
      }
    }
  ]
}It is a part of the planned Kovalam-Bekal Waterway. The Nelliyadi Kadavu Bridge was constructed over Akalapuzha connecting Koyilandy Municipality to Keezhariyur village and was inaugurated by the then Chief Minister of Kerala, Mr. E K Nayanar on January 30, 2000.

SARBTM Govt. College Koyilandy is located on the shore of Akalapuzha.

Tourism 
It is a major tourist spot with boat services and leisure activities.

The Pamban thuruth is a known place among the film industry. Akalapuzha started receiving attention by the release of the Malayalam movie Theevandi.

This lake is shallow and home to many fishes, including shellfish. The Karimeen (Pearl Spot) nurtured in the Akalappuzha Backwaters are often an evening delicacy.

Fishing using fishing rods from the Nelliyadi Kadavu Bridge is a popular activity among the people around this region.

Nearby tourist attractions include:

  from Thikkodi Drive in Beach
  from Kollam Chira
  from Kodikkal Beach Volleyball Court
  from Parapally beach, Kollam
  from Kappad Beach
 Kadalundi Bird Sanctuary

Connectivity 
Nearest railway station: Thikkodi, Payyoli, Koyilandy Railway Station, Vadakara Railway Station, Kozhikode Railway Station

Nearest airport: Calicut International Airport, Kannur International Airport

Nearby villages and towns 
Keezhariyur (east), Thurayur (north), Payyoli (northwest), Thikkodi (west), Viyyur(Koyilandy) (west).

References

Lakes of Kerala